Raja Veetu Pillai is a 1967 Indian Tamil-language film directed by Dada Mirasi and written by M. K. Santharam. The film stars Jaishankar and Jayalalithaa. It was a successful film on its release. Jayalalithaa dressed up as cowgirl with shorts and started off a trend.

Plot

Cast 
Male cast
Jaishankar as Raja
M. N. Nambiar as Aanand
V. S. Raghavan as  Raghunathan's father
Srikanth as Raghunathan
Thengai Srinivasan as Singaram

Female cast
Jayalalithaa as Raja's love interest
Pushpalatha as Geetha
Jayabharathi as Anandhi

Production 
The film originally began production under the title Inba Nila, with M. G. Ramachandran starring. It was later shelved, but restarted production under the title Raja Veetu Pillai, with Ramachandran now replaced by Jaishankar.

Soundtrack 
All the songs were written by Vaali and the music was composed by S. M. Subbaiah Naidu.

References

Bibliography

External links 
 

1960s Tamil-language films
1967 films
Films scored by S. M. Subbaiah Naidu